CGS-15943 is a drug which acts as a potent and reasonably selective antagonist for the adenosine receptors A1 and A2A, having a Ki of 3.3nM at A2A and 21nM at A1. It was one of the first adenosine receptor antagonists discovered that is not a xanthine derivative, instead being a triazoloquinazoline. Consequently, CGS-15943 has the advantage over most xanthine derivatives that it is not a phosphodiesterase inhibitor, and so has more a specific pharmacological effects profile. It produces similar effects to caffeine in animal studies, though with higher potency.

See also
 ATL-444
 SCH-58261

References 

Adenosine receptor antagonists
Experimental drugs
2-Furyl compounds